Jürgen Friedl is an Austrian professional footballer who plays as a midfielder for Union Weißkirchen. He has played for several clubs since 2001, including Red Bull Salzburg in the Bundesliga.

References

1981 births
Living people
Austrian Football Bundesliga players
FC Red Bull Salzburg players
Association football midfielders
Austrian footballers
ASKÖ Pasching players